Philonotis is a genus of mosses belonging to the family Bartramiaceae.

The genus was first described by Samuel Elisée Bridel-Brideri.

The genus has cosmopolitan distribution.

Species:
 Philonotis caespitosa Jur.

References

Bartramiales
Moss genera